Zoblazo is a musical style from Abidjan, Côte d'Ivoire, created in the early 1990s. It is a cosmopolitan popular dance music with simple up-tempo rhythm and high tech instrumentation and contains a mixture of traditional dance rhythms from southern Côte d'Ivoire.

Zoblazo's best known exponent is Freddy Meiway, who has released a series of Zoblazo records starting in 1989 with the record  "Ayibebou" with his group Zo Gang. An ethnic N'Zema from Grand Bassam, Meiway integrated folk rhythms from Côte d'Ivoire and Ghana with and is danced to with a white handkerchief. From his second album in 1990 entitled 200% Zoblazo, Meiway became the second best known Ivorian and N'zema musician after Alpha Blondy, and has released a steady stream records, the most recent 9ème commandement –900% zoblazo released in 2007.

External links
  RFI Musique: Meiway Biography, January 2007.
Review Meiway - Golgotha (800% Zoblazo): Africa On Your Street, BBC.co.uk.
Meiway from Ivory Coast, JJC Reviews, May 2006: Africa On Your Street, BBC.co.uk. 

Ivorian styles of music
World music genres
Abidjan